This is a list of Billboard magazine's Top Hot 100 songs of 1959. The Top 100, as revealed in the year-end edition of Billboard dated December 14, 1959, is based on Hot 100 charts from the issue dates of January through November 1959.

See also
1959 in music
List of Billboard Hot 100 number-one singles of 1959
List of Billboard Hot 100 top-ten singles in 1959

References

1959 record charts
Billboard charts